Zoran Šupić (born July 21, 1984) is a Bosnian Serb retired football player.

Club career
Born in Banja Luka, SR Bosnia and Herzegovina, Šupić spent most of his career in Serbia, where he played for second-level sides FK Remont Čačak and FK Metalac Gornji Milanovac, and then top-league sides OFK Beograd, FK Bežanija, FK Novi Pazar and FK BSK Borča.

Then he also played in Hungary with top-level sides Győri ETO FC, Diósgyőri VTK and Lombard-Pápa TFC, and in Romanian Liga II with UTA Arad.  During the winter break of the 2014–15 season he joined Bosnian top-level side NK Travnik.

References

External links
 Zoran Supic at Soccerway

1984 births
Living people
Sportspeople from Banja Luka
Serbs of Bosnia and Herzegovina
Association football defenders
Bosnia and Herzegovina footballers
FK Remont Čačak players
OFK Beograd players
FK Metalac Gornji Milanovac players
FK Bežanija players
Győri ETO FC players
Diósgyőri VTK players
Lombard-Pápa TFC footballers
FK Novi Pazar players
FK BSK Borča players
FC UTA Arad players
NK Travnik players
FK Odžaci players
Metro Gallery FC players
Serbian SuperLiga players
Nemzeti Bajnokság I players
Bosnia and Herzegovina expatriate footballers
Expatriate footballers in Serbia and Montenegro
Bosnia and Herzegovina expatriate sportspeople in Serbia and Montenegro
Expatriate footballers in Serbia
Bosnia and Herzegovina expatriate sportspeople in Serbia
Expatriate footballers in Hungary
Bosnia and Herzegovina expatriate sportspeople in Hungary
Expatriate footballers in Romania
Bosnia and Herzegovina expatriate sportspeople in Romania
Expatriate footballers in Hong Kong
Bosnia and Herzegovina expatriate sportspeople in Hong Kong